European Political Science Review (EPSR) is a quarterly peer-reviewed academic journal published by Cambridge University Press in conjunction with the European Consortium for Political Research featuring scholarly research in political science. The journal covers not only European political issues, but also includes global issues and non-European topics. The joint editors-in-chief are Carlos Closa (Institute for Public Goods and Policies, Spanish National Research Council) and Matt Qvortrup (Coventry University).

Abstracting and indexing 
According to the Journal Citation Reports, the journal has a 2020 impact factor of 4.143, ranking it 25th out of 182 journals in the category "Political Science".

See also 
 List of political science journals

References

External links 
 

Cambridge University Press academic journals
English-language journals
Political science journals
Publications established in 2009
Quarterly journals